The Aviator is a 1929 American Pre-Code Vitaphone comedy film produced and released by Warner Bros. Directed by Roy Del Ruth, the film was based on the play of the same name by James Montgomery and stars Edward Everett Horton and Patsy Ruth Miller. The Aviator is similar to the silent comedy The Hottentot (1922), where a hapless individual has to pretend to be a famous steeplehorse jockey. The Aviator today is considered a lost film.

Plot
Brooks (William Norton Bailey), a publisher and his publicist (Lee Moran) decide to  boost the sales of a wartime book of flying experiences. They credit the book to popular author Robert Street (Edward Everett Horton), who is completely ignorant about aviation. Robert gets into all sorts of trouble in attempting to carry on the ruse, saving his friend's business but also attracting the attention of aviation-mad Grace Douglas (Patsy Ruth Miller). At first, he is able to carry out simple publicity events, but when he accidentally starts up an aircraft, his incredible aerobatics end with a landing in a haystack. When a race is staged between him and French ace Major Jules Gaillard (Armand Kaliz), it ends with Robert confessing he is no pilot, but still winning Grace's heart.

Cast

 Edward Everett Horton as Robert Street
 Patsy Ruth Miller as Grace Douglas
 Johnny Arthur as Hobart
 William Norton Bailey as Brooks
 Armand Kaliz as Major Jules Gaillard
 Edward Martindel as Gordon
 Lee Moran as Brown
 Kewpie Morgan as Sam Robinson
 Phillips Smalley as John Douglas

Production
The Aviator appeared at a time when aviation films were extremely popular, with only western films being made in larger numbers. It was typical to even have aircraft show up in a western. Blending comedy in The Aviator with aerial thrills seemed to be an ideal way to satisfy the public's appetite for aviation subjects.

Reception
The Aviator was well received as both a comedy and an aviation film. Hal Erickson wrote, "The ensuing wild ride through the air is the best part of the picture, with Robert trying to maintain his equilibrium and dignity throughout."

The film was remade in 1930 as Going Wild, starring Joe E. Brown. A foreign-language version in French was made in 1931 and was entitled L'aviateur. In 1938, eight years after Going Wild, Warner Bros. remade this movie again as a musical titled Going Places, starring Dick Powell (impersonating a famous horseman), with Ronald Reagan appearing in an early role.

Preservation
No film elements of The Aviator are known to survive. The soundtrack, which was recorded on Vitaphone disks, may survive in private hands.

On February 13, 1956, Jack Warner sold the rights to all of his pre-1950 films to Associated Artists Productions. It does not appear to have been shown on television or reissued.

See also
List of lost films
List of early Warner Bros. sound and talking features

References
Notes

Bibliography
 Wynne, H. Hugh. The Motion Picture Stunt Pilots and Hollywood's Classic Aviation Movies. Missoula, Montana: Pictorial Histories Publishing Co., 1987. .

External links
 

1929 films
1929 comedy films
American comedy films
American aviation films
American black-and-white films
1920s English-language films
Remakes of American films
American films based on plays
Films directed by Roy Del Ruth
Lost American films
Warner Bros. films
Films with screenplays by Robert Lord (screenwriter)
1929 lost films
Lost comedy films
1920s American films